Loucks Grove Church (Wahtawah Christian Church) is a historic church in Greenfield, Iowa, United States that is.National Register of Historic Places (NRHP).

Description
The church was built in 1895 and added to the NRHP November 22, 1995.  Its National Register nomination notes its significance as follows:
Loucks Grove Church stands as the lone example of an unchanged Gothic influenced rural religious building of the late 19th century in Adair County, Iowa. Such buildings represented about two-thirds of the county's churches in 1895. It is a simple, white, frame building that has withstood the test of time and has undergone no structural changes in one hundred years. With the exception of electricity and a propane space heater, it is today as it was then in 1895. The vestibule with its decorative hardware on the doors and an ogee arch window, and the sanctuary with its pointed arch windows and rounded ceiling that exhibit the Gothic influence still show the original design and construction. It is the only church in Adair County with such a distinction.

The congregation was a member of the Christian Church from 1895 to 1957, and a non-denominational church after that.

See also

 National Register of Historic Places listings in Adair County, Iowa

References

Churches in Iowa
Churches on the National Register of Historic Places in Iowa
Gothic Revival church buildings in Iowa
Churches completed in 1895
Buildings and structures in Adair County, Iowa
National Register of Historic Places in Adair County, Iowa
Carpenter Gothic church buildings in Iowa
Wooden churches in the United States